1602: New World is a five-issue Marvel Comics limited series and is the sequel to the 1602 limited series, and as such is set in the year 1602 in the same continuity as the original series and picks up where 1602 left off. This time the story is written by Greg Pak and illustrated by Greg Tocchini.

Plot
The story takes place largely on Roanoke Island, which is governed by Ananias Dare.  His daughter Virginia and Peter Parquagh (this world's Spider-Man) are fighting an invasion of dinosaurs, and tensions between the colonists and Native Americans are increasing, with Englishman Norman Osborne attempting to cheat the natives out of the island.  Unrest about metahumans is also increasing, led by newspaperman J. Jonah Jameson.  Osbourne is quick to blame this on the natives and Rojhaz (this world's Captain America).

This world's Hulk (David Banner) has apparently killed King James, and is wondering where his allegiances lie.  He is identified on Roanoke Island by Peter.  Banner is an enemy of the colony after attempting to kill Sir Nicholas Fury, and is almost executed, but is reprieved and taken by the dinosaurs.

In London, King James, who is still alive, tells Lord Iron (this world's Iron Man) to retrieve Banner, whom the King is worried about.  Iron's arrival in the New World with Rhodes and Captain Ross is violent.  Dare is ultimately arrested for treason for his declaration of independence.

Osborne and Ross plot to capture the Source, which gives the metahumans their power, but Peter interferes and tells their plans to policeman Dougan.  Virginia forces Iron and Rhodes to forswear their loyalty to the English.

Dougan, the Spider (Peter), and Dougan's men free Ananias. while fighting begins between the natives and the English. with the Spider. The natives and the Hulk arrive and begin to fight the English and Lord Iron. Osborne orders native chieftain Marioac to give him the Source, but is told that it died when Rojhaz left. Virginia orders everybody to stop fighting.

Lord Iron makes amends to Banner. Iron and Rhodes decide to stay at the colony, and rebuild Jameson's printing press. Banner leaves with the English soldiers to be executed. The colonists and natives make peace, and Osborne is tried and imprisoned for his crimes.

Characters

Historical
James VI of Scotland and I of England, His firm belief in the Divine Right of Kings and strong views on witchcraft (including the witchbreed) mean he is cast as something of a villain.

Virginia Dare, the daughter of Ananias Dare, and the first English child born in the Americas. In this world, the Roanoke Colony did not disappear in the 1580s. Inspired by a legend that Virginia was killed in the shape of a white deer, Gaiman gives his version shapeshifting powers. Gaiman has revealed he has told fans that he created Virginia Dare without a Marvel character basis to provide a unique and fully American character to tie in the 1602 universe with our real world.

Heroes
Peter Parquagh, Peter works at the newspaper run by Jonah Jameson. Near the end of the 1602 series he was bitten by spider giving him strange powers. When he dons a webbed mask and a leather doublet, Parquagh becomes 'The Spider'. Peter also appears to have some feelings for Virginia, even though he is too shy to express them. He is the Spider-Man of 1602.

David Banner, was an advisor to James VI and I. Towards the end of 1602 he is caught in the energies of the Anomaly and becomes a brutish monster. He is this world's Incredible Hulk. Uncommonly, The Hulk himself is the hero, being a noble man, seeking to defend the native Indians from the colonists. David Banner is an evil man, a torturer and assassin, who lives in fear of the more noble Hulk, even considering himself damned and lost as a witchbreed.

Enemies
Norman Osborne wants to trick the Native Americans into selling the island of Roanoke. However, they have been educated in the English language by 'Rojhaz' (Captain America from the future) and see the flaw in his contract. He seeks to turn the colony against the natives, because he believes that the natives are hiding something of great value. He may become this world's Green Goblin.

Lord Iron is a Spaniard weaponeer, famous for his inventions, who was captured during the war against England and forced by long weeks of torture to manufacture new and deadly weapons. He since had a grudge against the man who tortured him—David Banner. We can assume that the painful tortures he was forced to endure had damaged his heart, as the piece of shrapnel damaged the heart of his modern counterpart. He wears a suit of armour powered by electricity, and he is this world's Iron Man. Despite his allegiance, he has no special loyalty towards King James, and merely seeks revenge on David Banner, and by association, the Hulk.

Supporting
Jonah Jameson, an Irish-accented newspaper owner in the New World. Exactly like his Marvel Universe counterpart, J. Jonah Jameson, including his dislike of people with "powers". His newspaper is called the Daily Trumpet, rather than the Bugle.

Rhodes is Lord Iron's Moorish engineer. His Marvel Universe counterpart is James Rupert Rhodes, or War Machine.

Captain Ross is the English captain of the vessel that transports Lord Iron to the New World. He is the 1602 manifestation of Marvel's General Thunderbolt Ross, since both men were charged with subduing the Incredible Hulk and his human counterpart.

Dougan was once part of Fury's army, and was the only member of it to go with the main cast of 1602 to Doom's castle and the new world. Dougan stayed in New World and became the head of the police force, becoming a friend to Dare. He is the counterpart of this worlds Dum Dum Dugan, who is a member of the organization run by Fury.

Marioac  is the leader of the local Native Americans who are feuding with the colonists. She becomes a sort of friend to both Peter and Banner, and is portrayed as a little magical or supernatural. She is not based on a character in the traditional Marvel Universe

Governor Dare is the governor of the colony and a wise and heroic man, although not based on a Marvel character.

Collected editions
1602: New World was collected as a trade paperback, published in January 2006

See also
Marvel 1602
Marvel 1602: Fantastick Four

References

2005 comics debuts
Superhero comics
Comics by Greg Pak